IJHL may refer to:

Island Junior Hockey League, a Junior "B" ice hockey league in Prince Edward Island, Canada founded in 1996
Island Junior Hockey League (1973–1991), the original IJHL in Price Edward Island
International Junior Hockey League, an independent Tier III Junior A ice hockey league in the northeastern United States